Truman Franklin Wilbanks (September 27, 1891 – December 29, 1967) was an American football coach and educator. He served as the head football coach at the University of Louisiana at Lafayette (then known as Southwestern Louisiana Industrial Institute) from 1931 to 1936.

Wilbanks was born on September 27, 1891, in  Jena, Louisiana, to Henry Gregg Wilbanks and Liza Bradford Wilbanks. He attended school in Jena. A 1916 graduate of Centenary College in Shreveport, Louisiana, Wilbanks played for the LSU Tigers football team, earning a letter in 1917 as a halfback. He and his wife, Ruth Kessinger, both taught at high schools in Homer and Baton Rouge, Louisiana.

Wilbanks died on December 29, 1967, in Mer Rouge, Louisiana, following a long illness.

Head coaching record

College

References

External links
 

1891 births
1967 deaths
20th-century American educators
American football halfbacks
LSU Tigers football players
Louisiana Ragin' Cajuns football coaches
Centenary College of Louisiana alumni
High school football coaches in Louisiana
People from Jena, Louisiana
Coaches of American football from Louisiana
Players of American football from Louisiana
Schoolteachers from Louisiana